The 1989 Los Angeles Rams season was the franchise's 52nd season in the National Football League, their 42nd overall, and their 44th in the Greater Los Angeles Area.  It constituted their last postseason appearance in Los Angeles before owner Georgia Frontiere, who would eventually move the team to St. Louis six seasons later, sold many top players, and in the playoffs, they were defeated by the eventual Super Bowl champion San Francisco 49ers.

It also constituted their last winning season until 1999 in St. Louis, and last in Los Angeles until 2017.

Offseason

NFL Draft

Roster

Regular season

Schedule

Game Summaries

Week 1 
Network: CBS
TV Announcers: Steve Zabriskie and Terry Bradshaw
Falcons rookie Deion Sanders gave the home crowd an early lift with a punt return TD (despite fumbling the ball twice), but Rams pulled away in the second half behind 128 yards rushing and two touchdowns by Greg Bell.  Kevin Greene had three sacks.

Week 2 
Jim Everett and Henry Ellard hooked up for three scores as the Rams had another strong second half.

Week  3 
Rams rolled to a 38–7 halftime lead behind Bell's 221 rushing yards and 2 TD's and 2 more TD passes by Everett, but barely held off a furious comeback from the Packers behind Don Majkowski.

Week 4 
Rams got early NFC West bragging rights in a tough road win.  Everett hit Willie Anderson on a 65-yard TD bomb for the game's only TD.

Week 5 
Everett passed for two touchdowns and Mike Lansford booted four field goals.

Week 6 
In a wild Monday night affair, Frank Reich, subbing for an injured Jim Kelly, tossed a pair of 4th quarter TD passes including the game-winner to Andre Reed.

Week 7 
A 2–4 Saints team blew out the Rams on their home turf behind 3 TD passes by Bobby Hebert.  Saints local product Dalton Hilliard from LSU had 3 TD's, two rushing and one receiving.

Week 8 
Rams lost their third straight in the cold of Chicago as the Bear defense held Everett to 13 of 35 passing and intercepted him twice.

Week  9 
In a highly unusual overtime loss, the Rams kept the Vikings out of the end zone, but Vikings kicker Rich Karlis booted seven FG's.  The winning score came when LB Mike Merriweather blocked a Dale Hatcher punt out of the end zone for a safety.  The Vikings became the first NFL team ever to win in sudden death OT on a safety.

Week 10 
Rams got back to their winning ways behind two Everett TD passes and two Bell TD runs.

Week 11 
Rams rolled to a 24–0 halftime lead and cruised behind two more TD passes from Everett.  Robert Delpino had a 32-yd TD run as well.

Week 12 
Saints were in control at the Superdome, leading 17–3 after 3.  Everett, however, led the Rams back behind 454 passing yards, a record 336 of them receiving on 15 catches in a monster performance by Willie Anderson.

Week 13 
Everett outdueled Dallas rookie Troy Aikman in a spirited performance by the 1–11 Cowboys.  Both QB's had 4 TD's passing. Late in the game with the Rams leading 35-31 but Dallas driving; an attempt by Aikman to get the signal for the next play was mistaken for a timeout signal by umpire Art Demmas; costing the Cowboys their final timeout. Dallas advanced on the drive to the Los Angeles 10 yard line but couldn't stop the clock before time ran out.

Week 14 
In a classic MNF performance, Joe Montana tossed three TD's, two of them for over 90 yards to John Taylor.  Rams led 27-10 entering the final period when Montana hit Mike Wilson for a TD to cut it to 27–17.  The Rams were driving to a TD when Everett fumbled a snap at the 49er 4, and on the very next play, Montana hit Taylor for a 96-yd TD to cut it to 27–23.  The 49ers capped their amazing comeback a Roger Craig TD run after Ron Brown fumbled the ensuing kickoff.

Week 15 
The Rams took out their frustrations on the Jets by rolling to a 28–7 halftime lead and cruising behind two passing TD's from Everett and two rushing TD's from Bell.

Week 16 
Bell ran for 210 yards and the winning score in the 4th as the Rams clinched a wild-card berth.

Standings

Playoffs

NFC Wild Card Game

Despite being underdogs on the road, the Rams took a 14–0 lead in the first quarter as Jim Everett connected for touchdowns to Henry Ellard and Damone Johnson. The Eagles offense, led by explosive quarterback Randall Cunningham, was held in check by Fritz Shurmur's zone defense which prevented Philadelphia from making big plays downfield. Still, the Eagles closed the gap to 14–7 in the fourth quarter on a touchdown run by Anthony Toney. But Rams running back Greg Bell broke off a 54-yard run down the left sideline down to the Eagles 10-yard-line, then finished off his 124-yard rushing day two plays later with his 27th carry going for seven yards and L.A.'s final touchdown. Los Angeles won in the wild card round for the first time since 1983.

NFC Divisional Playoff

Playing on the East Coast for the third time in as many weeks, the Rams faced off against the NFC East champions in a tough defensive battle. New York jumped to a 6–0 lead in the first quarter with two field goals by kicker Raul Allegre. But with 17 seconds left in the first half, Jim Everett found Flipper Anderson for a 20-yard touchdown reception that, with Mike Lansford's PAT, gave the Rams a 7–6 lead at the intermission. In the third quarter, the Giants retook the lead as running back Ottis Anderson scored on a 2-yard touchdown. But in the fourth period, Lansford made two field goals to tie the game, the second one coming with 3:01 left in regulation and eventually send the game into overtime. Receiving the kickoff, the Rams drove 78 yards, with a key pass interference call on Giants cornerback Sheldon White that gave Los Angeles a first down in Giants territory. Two plays later, Everett found Anderson for a 30-yard touchdown pass to end the game just 1:06 into the extra period. Rams receiver Henry Ellard had the best postseason performance of his career with 8 receptions for 125 yards, while Everett had 315 yards passing for the game.

NFC Championship Game

The Rams' season came to an end against the rival 49ers. Starting at midfield on its first possession, L.A. drove 44 yards in 10 plays, ending with a 23-yard field goal by Mike Lansford. On the ensuing San Francisco drive, linebacker Larry Kelm recovered a fumble by 49ers tight end Brent Jones, but the Rams drive stalled as Jim Everett twice attempted deep passes to Flipper Anderson which fell incomplete. L.A. was forced to punt the ball away, and never threatened to score again. The 49ers scored on three straight possessions in the second quarter and totaled 442 yards on offense and held the ball for 39:48 for the game. The Rams were held to only 26 yards rushing and Everett threw three interceptions in the loss, L.A.'s second appearance in the NFC Championship Game in five seasons.

Awards and records
Flipper Anderson, NFL Game Record, Most Receiving Yards in One Game, 336 yards (vs. New Orleans Saints on November 26, 1989) 
 NFC Pro Bowl Selections - Henry Ellard WR, Jerry Gray CB (Pro Bowl MVP), Kevin Greene OLB, Tom Newberry LG, Jackie Slater RT, Doug Smith C

Milestones

See also
Los Angeles Rams
Anaheim Stadium
1989 NFL season

Other Anaheim–based teams in 1989
 California Angels (Anaheim Stadium)
 1989 California Angels season

References

External links
1989 Los Angeles Rams Season at Pro-Football Reference

Los Angeles Rams
Los Angeles Rams seasons
Los Ang